Louis Victoire Athanase Dupré (28 December 1808 – 10 August 1869) was a French mathematician and physicist noted for his 1860s publications on the mechanical theory of heat (thermodynamics); work that was said to have inspired the publications of engineer François Massieu and his Massieu functions; which in turn inspired the work of American engineer Willard Gibbs and his fundamental equations.

See also
Young–Dupré equation

References

Athanase Dupre Biography at the MacTutor History of Mathematics archive

Thermodynamicists
1869 deaths
1808 births
French mathematicians
French physicists
People from Yonne